Millettia leucantha or sathon is a species of plant in the family Fabaceae.

It is a perennial flowering tree found in Laos, Myanmar and Thailand.

It is the provincial tree and flower of Khorat or Nakhon Ratchasima Province in Isaan (Thailand), where it is known as sathon (สาธร).

Uses
Sathon sauce is a flavouring sauce used in Isaan cuisine. The leaves of two species of Millettia are used for making sathon sauce: Millettia utilis and Millettia leucantha var. buetoides. This sauce used for cooking is the only OTOP product made from the sathon tree.

See also
Millettia laurentii
Senna siamea

References

External links
Province plant- Khorat
Detailed picture
Thai plants
Studies on the Chemical Constituents of Stem Bark of Millettia leucantha

leucantha
Trees of Myanmar
Trees of Laos
Trees of Thailand
Nakhon Ratchasima province